The 1983 Santa Clara Broncos football team represented Santa Clara University as a member of the Western Football Conference (WFC) during the 1983 NCAA Division II football season. The Broncos were led by head coach Pat Malley in his 25th year at the helm. They played home games at Buck Shaw Stadium in Santa Clara, California. The team finished the season as WFC co-champion, with a record of six wins and four losses (6–4, 2–1 WFC). The Broncos outscored their opponents 173–144 for the season.

Schedule

Team players in the NFL
The following Santa Clara Broncos players were selected in the 1984 NFL Draft.

References

Santa Clara
Santa Clara Broncos football seasons
Western Football Conference champion seasons
Santa Clara Broncos football